The enzyme fucosterol-epoxide lyase catalyzes the chemical reaction

(24R,24′R)-fucosterol epoxide  desmosterol + acetaldehyde

This enzyme belongs to the family of lyases, specifically the aldehyde-lyases, which cleave carbon-carbon bonds.  The systematic name of this enzyme class is (24R,24'R)-fucosterol-epoxide acetaldehyde-lyase (desmosterol-forming). This enzyme is also called (24R,24'R)-fucosterol-epoxide acetaldehyde-lyase.

References

 

EC 4.1.2
Enzymes of unknown structure